Charles James Haughey (16 September 1925 – 13 June 2006) was an Irish Fianna Fáil politician who served as Taoiseach on three occasions – 1979 to 1981, March to December 1982 and 1987 to 1992. Haughey led four governments while serving as Taoiseach; December 1979 to June 1981, March to December 1982, March 1987 to June 1989, and June 1989 to February 1992. He was also Minister for the Gaeltacht from 1987 to 1992, Leader of the Opposition from 1981 to 1982 and 1982 to 1987, Leader of Fianna Fáil from 1979 to 1992, Minister for Social Welfare and for Health from 1977 to 1979, Minister for Finance from 1966 to 1970, Minister for Agriculture from 1964 to 1966, Minister for Justice from 1961 to 1964 and Parliamentary Secretary to the Minister for Justice from 1959 to 1961. He served as a Teachta Dála (TD) from 1957 to 1992.

Haughey was first elected to Dáil Éireann as a Fianna Fáil TD in 1957 and was re-elected at every election until 1992, representing successively the Dublin North-East, Dublin Artane and Dublin North-Central constituencies.

Haughey was the dominant Irish politician of his generation, as well as the most controversial. Upon entering government in the early 1960s, Haughey became the symbol of a new vanguard of Irish Ministers. As Taoiseach, he is credited by some economists with starting the positive transformation of the economy in the late 1980s. However, his career was also marked by several major scandals. Haughey was implicated in the Arms Crisis of 1970, which nearly destroyed his career. His political reputation revived, his tenure as Taoiseach was then damaged by the sensational GUBU Affair in 1982; his party leadership was challenged four times, each time unsuccessfully, earning Haughey the nickname "The Great Houdini". Revelations about his role in a phone tapping scandal forced him to resign as Taoiseach and retire from politics in 1992.

After Haughey's retirement from politics, further revelations of corruption, embezzlement, tax evasion and a 27-year extra-marital affair tarnished his already chequered reputation. He died of prostate cancer in 2006, aged 80.

Early life
He was born in Castlebar, County Mayo in 1925, the third of seven children, of Seán Haughey and Sarah McWilliams, both natives of Swatragh, County Londonderry.  Haughey's father was in the Irish Republican Army during the Irish War of Independence, then in the National Army of the Irish Free State. Seán Haughey left the army in 1928 and the family moved to County Meath; he subsequently developed multiple sclerosis and the family moved again to Donnycarney, a northern suburb of Dublin, where Charles Haughey spent his youth.

Haughey was educated by the Irish Christian Brothers at St Joseph's secondary school in Fairview, where one of his classmates was George Colley, subsequently his cabinet colleague and rival in Fianna Fáil. In his youth he was an active amateur sportsman, playing Gaelic football with the Parnells GAA Club in Donnycarney; he won a Dublin Senior Football Championship medal in 1945. Haughey studied commerce at University College Dublin (UCD), where he took a first class Honours degree in 1946. It was at UCD that Haughey became increasingly interested in politics and was elected Auditor of the Commerce & Economics Society. He also met there one of his future political rival, Garret FitzGerald.

He joined the Local Defence Force during "The Emergency" in 1941 and considered a permanent career in the Army. He continued to serve in the reserve FCÁ force, until entering Dáil Éireann in 1957.

On VE-day Haughey and other UCD students burnt the British Union Jack on College Green, outside Trinity College Dublin, in response to a perceived disrespect afforded the Irish tricolour among the flags hung by the college in celebration of the Allied victory which ended World War II.

Haughey qualified as a chartered accountant and also attended King's Inns. He was subsequently called to the Irish Bar. Shortly afterwards, he set up the accountancy firm of Haughey, Boland & Company with Harry Boland, son of Fianna Fáil Minister Gerald Boland.

On 18 September 1951, he married Maureen Lemass, the daughter of the Fianna Fáil Minister and future Taoiseach Seán Lemass, having been close to her since their days at UCD, where they first met. They had four children together: Eimear, Conor, Ciarán and Seán.

This historic house, once owned by Anglo-Irish politician John Beresford, had been extensively re-designed by the architect James Gandon in the late 18th century and it became the Haughey family home, where he lived for the rest of his life. This marked the beginning of a long period when Haughey's spending was well beyond his apparent income level. For the rest of his life Haughey would refuse to say where the extra money came from.

Early political career
He started his political career as a local councillor, being a member of Dublin Corporation from 1953 to 1955. Haughey's first attempt at election to Dáil Éireann came in June 1951, when he unsuccessfully contested the general election. While living in Raheny, Haughey was first elected to the Dáil as a Fianna Fáil TD at the 1957 general election for the Dublin North-East constituency; it was his fourth attempt.

Haughey was re-elected in every election until 1992, representing Dublin North-East from 1957 to 1977, Dublin Artane from 1977 to 1981, and Dublin North-Central from 1981 until his retirement in 1992 (moving constituencies in line with boundary changes).

In 1959, Haughey obtained his first government position, that of Parliamentary Secretary to the Minister for Justice, serving under his constituency colleague Oscar Traynor, appointed by the first government of his father-in-law Seán Lemass. It is unclear whether the choice was made by Lemass directly as Taoiseach, or by the cabinet against his wishes. Lemass had advised Haughey;
As Taoiseach it is my duty to offer you the post of parliamentary secretary, and as your father-in-law I am advising you not to take it.
Haughey ignored Lemass's advice and accepted the offer. Although officially junior to Traynor, Haughey was the  minister, as Traynor, a minister in governments since the 1930s, was elderly and in poor health, and only nominally running the department. Haughey and Traynor clashed openly.

Haughey came to epitomise the new style of politician – the "men in the mohair suits". He regularly socialised with other younger cabinet colleagues, such as Donogh O'Malley and Brian Lenihan.

Haughey's status by 1961 was such that Leader of the Opposition James Dillon complimented him lavishly on the floor of the Dáil, remarking on his opponent's "skill with which he has had recourse to his brief," as well as his "extraordinary erudition" and "his exceptional and outstanding ability."

Ministerial office

Minister for Justice
When Traynor retired in 1961, Haughey succeeded him as Minister for Justice. As such, he initiated an extensive scale of legislative reforms. He introduced new legislation including the Adoption Act; the Succession Act, which protected the inheritance rights of wives and children; the Criminal Justice Act, which severely restricted the application of capital punishment; and the Extradition Act, which virtually prevented extradition for IRA offences. Haughey also introduced the Special Military Courts which helped to defeat the Irish Republican Army's Border Campaign.

Minister for Agriculture: 1966 Farmers' Strike
In 1964, Lemass appointed Haughey as Minister for Agriculture. Criticism was voiced from the National Farmers Association (NFA) of the appointment of a non-rural person to the position, and there was increased antagonism from farmers towards the government. Haughey became embroiled in a series of controversies with the NFA and with another organisation, the Irish Creamery Milk Suppliers Association (ICMSA). Twenty-seven ICMSA picketers outside Leinster House, were arrested on 27 April 1966 under the Offences Against the State Act, an act originally intended for use against the IRA. 78 were arrested the following day, and 80 a day later as the dispute escalated. The general public was supportive of the farmers, who were not in a position to hold a strike to air their grievances, and who were clearly only posing a problem to the Minister, rather than the state. The farmers then began a national solidarity campaign, and even farmers who supported Fianna Fáil turned against the government. Haughey, who did not rely on rural voters, was under intense pressure from fearful members of his own party to negotiate a deal and reduce the tension. It was Haughey's first alienation of a significant voting block, and probably damaged him electorally in later years as many farmers remembered the events, known in folk memory as the "Farmers' Strike".

Minister for Finance and 1966 presidential election

Haughey was appointed by Fianna Fáil to run President Éamon de Valera's re-election campaign for the 1966 presidential election. His interventions proved highly controversial. Fine Gael chose a comparatively young TD and barrister, Tom O'Higgins (nephew of Kevin O'Higgins), to run against de Valera. Aware that de Valera's age (84) and almost total blindness might compare unfavourably to O'Higgins, whose campaign drew comparisons with the equally youthful US President John F. Kennedy, Haughey launched what was seen as a political stroke. He insisted that it was beneath the presidency to actively campaign, meaning that de Valera would have a low profile. Therefore, in the interests of fairness the media was asked to give O'Higgins an equally low profile, ignoring his speeches and publicity campaign. The print media, both nationally and locally, ignored Haughey's suggestion. But the state-run Raidió Teilifís Éireann, facing criticism from Lemass' government for being too radical in other areas, agreed and largely ignored the O'Higgins campaign.

De Valera got a high media profile from a different source, the fiftieth anniversary commemoration of the Easter Rising, of which he was the most senior survivor. While O'Higgins's campaign was ignored by RTÉ, de Valera appeared in RTÉ coverage of the Rising events regularly. To add further to de Valera's campaign, Haughey as Agriculture Minister arranged for milk price increases to be given to farmers on the eve of polling, as a way of reducing farmer disquiet after they had effectively become an opposition movement to the government.

These tactics should have ensured an easy de Valera victory. Instead O'Higgins came within less than one percent of winning the vote, with de Valera re-elected by a narrow margin of ten thousand votes out of a total of nearly one million. De Valera came to distrust Haughey; Frank Aiken, Minister for Foreign Affairs under de Valera and his lifelong political confidant, dismissed Haughey's political motives as being entirely selfish, and believed he was motivated to hold power for its own sake and not duty.

In 1966, the Taoiseach Seán Lemass retired. Haughey declared his candidature to succeed Lemass in the consequent leadership election, and George Colley and Neil Blaney did likewise. As this meant that there were three strong candidates who held strong and divisive views on the future of the party, the party elders sought to find a compromise candidate. Lemass himself encouraged his Minister for Finance Jack Lynch, to contest the party leadership, and encouraged Colley, Haughey and Blaney to withdraw in favour of Lynch, arguing that they would not win a contest against him. However, Colley refused the Taoiseach's request and insisted on remaining in the race, but he was defeated by Lynch. Upon Lynch's election as Taoiseach, Haughey was appointed Minister for Finance by Lynch, in a cabinet reshuffle, which indicated that Haughey's withdrawal was a gain at the expense of Colley. The inexpensive and socially inclusive initiatives that Haughey made caught the public imagination; these included popular decisions to introduce free travel on public transport for pensioners, subsidise electricity for pensioners, the granting of special tax concessions for the disabled and tax exemptions for artists. They increased Haughey's populist appeal and his support from certain elements in the media and artistic community.

As Minister for Finance, Haughey on two occasions arranged foreign currency loans for the government which he then arranged to be left on deposit in foreign countries (Germany and the United States), in the local currencies, instead of immediately changing the loans to Irish pounds and depositing them in the exchequer. These actions were unconstitutional, because it effectively meant that the Minister for Finance was making a currency speculation against his own currency. When this was challenged by the Comptroller and Auditor General Eugene Francis Suttle, Haughey introduced a law to retrospectively legalise his actions. The debate was very short and the record shows no understanding of the issue by the Opposition Spokesperson for Finance, O'Higgins for Fine Gael and Tully for Labour. The legislation was passed on 26 November 1969.

Arms crisis

The late 1960s saw the old tensions boil over into an eruption of violence in Northern Ireland. Haughey was generally seen as coming from the pragmatist wing of the party, and was not believed to have strong opinions on the matter, despite having family links with Derry. Indeed, many presumed that he had a strong antipathy to physical force Irish republicanism; during his period as Minister for Justice he had followed a tough anti-IRA line, including using internment without trial against the IRA. The  in the cabinet were seen as Kevin Boland and Neil Blaney, both sons of founding fathers in the party with strong Old IRA pasts. Blaney was also a TD for Donegal; a staunchly Republican area which bordered Derry. They were opposed by those described as the "doves" of the cabinet; Tánaiste Erskine Childers, George Colley and Patrick Hillery. A fund of £100,000 was set up to give to the Nationalist people in the form of aid. Haughey, as Finance Minister would have a central role in the management of this fund.

There was general surprise when, in an incident known as the Arms Crisis, Haughey, along with Blaney, was sacked from Lynch's cabinet amid allegations of the use of the funds to import arms for use by the IRA. The Garda Special Branch informed the Minister for Justice Mícheál Ó Móráin and Taoiseach Jack Lynch that a plot to import arms existed and included government members, however Lynch took no action until the Special Branch made Leader of the Opposition Liam Cosgrave aware of the plot. Cosgrave told Lynch he knew of the plot and would announce it in the Dáil the next day if he didn't act. Lynch subsequently requested Haughey and Blaney to resign from cabinet. Both men refused, saying they did nothing illegal. Lynch then asked President de Valera to terminate their appointments as members of the government, a request that de Valera was required to grant by convention. Boland resigned in sympathy, while Mícheál Ó Móráin was dismissed one day earlier in a preemptive strike to ensure a subservient Minister for Justice was in place when the crisis broke. Lynch chose government chief whip Desmond O'Malley for the role. Haughey and Blaney were subsequently tried in court along with an army Officer, Captain James Kelly, and Albert Luykx, a former Flemish National Socialist and businessman, who allegedly used his contacts to buy the arms. After trial all the accused were acquitted but many refused to recognise the verdict of the courts. Although cleared of wrongdoing, it looked as if Haughey's political career was finished. Blaney and Boland eventually resigned from Fianna Fáil but Haughey remained. He spent his years on the backbenches – the wilderness years – building support within the grassroots of the party; during this time, he remained loyal to the party and served the leader, but after the debacle of the "arms crises" neither man trusted the other.

Leadership years

Opposition to Jack Lynch 
In 1975, Fianna Fáil was in opposition and Haughey had achieved enough grassroots support to warrant a recall to Jack Lynch's opposition front bench. Haughey was appointed Spokesman on Health and Social Welfare, a fairly minor portfolio at the time, but Haughey used the same imagination and skill he displayed in other positions to formulate innovative and far reaching policies. Two years later in 1977, Fianna Fáil returned to power with a massive parliamentary majority in Dáil Éireann, having had a very populist campaign (spearhead by Colley and O'Malley) to abolish rates, vehicle tax and other extraordinary concessions, which were short-lived. Haughey returned to the cabinet, after an absence of seven years, as Minister for Health and Social Welfare.

In this position he continued the progressive policies he had shown earlier by, among others, beginning the first government anti-smoking campaigns and legalising contraception, previously banned. Following the finding by the Supreme Court of Ireland, in McGee v The Attorney General, that there was a constitutional right to use contraceptives, he introduced The Family Planning Bill which proved to be highly controversial. The bill allowed a pharmacist to sell contraceptives on presentation of a medical prescription. Haughey called this bill "an Irish solution to an Irish problem". It is often stated that the recipient of the prescription had to be married, but the legislation did not include this requirement.

The fallout from the giveaway concessions that had re-elected the government under Lynch, led to a succession race to succeed Lynch. As well as this a group of backbenchers began to lobby in support of Haughey. This group, known as the "gang of five," consisted of Jackie Fahey, Tom McEllistrim, Seán Doherty, Mark Killilea Jnr and Albert Reynolds. Haughey was also helped by the TD Síle de Valera. The granddaughter of Éamon de Valera, she was highly critical of Jack Lynch's policy regards to Northern Ireland. In a speech at the Liam Lynch commemoration at Fermoy on 9 September, de Valera made a series of thinly veiled attacks on Lynch. Although Lynch quickly tried to impose party discipline, attempting to discipline her for opposing party policy at a parliamentary party meeting held at the 28th, de Valera correctly pointed out that she had not opposed the party policy regarding Northern Ireland which called for the declaration of the British intent to withdraw from Northern Ireland. Lynch left for a trip to the United States on 7 November. On the same day the government lost two by-elections to Fine Gael in Cork and in Cork North-East. During the trip Lynch claimed in an interview with The Washington Post that a five-kilometer air corridor between the border was agreed upon during the meeting with British Prime Minister Margaret Thatcher, to enhance security co-operation. This was something highly unsavoury to many in Fianna Fáil. When Lynch returned he was questioned on this by a Clare backbencher Bill Loughnane, along with Tom McEllistrim at a parliamentary party meeting. Lynch stated that the British did not have permission to overfly the border. Afterwards Loughnane went public with the details of the meeting and accused Lynch of deliberately misleading the party. An attempt to remove the whip from Loughnane failed. At this stage Lynch's position had become untenable, with supporters of Haughey and George Colley caucusing opinion within the party.

In December 1979, Lynch announced his resignation as Taoiseach and leader of Fianna Fáil. The leadership contest that resulted was a two-horse race between Haughey and the Tánaiste, George Colley. Colley had the support of the entire cabinet, with the exception of Michael O'Kennedy, and felt that this popularity would be reflected within the parliamentary party as a whole.

Haughey on the other hand was distrusted by a number of his cabinet colleagues, but was much more respected by new backbenchers who were worried about the safety of their Dáil seats. When the vote was taken Haughey emerged as the victor by a margin of 44 votes to 38, a very clear division within the party. In a conciliatory gesture, Colley was re-appointed as Tánaiste and had a veto over whom Haughey would appoint as Ministers for Justice and for Defence. This was due to his distrust of Haughey on security issues (because of the Arms Crisis). However, he was removed from the important position of Minister for Finance.

Nonetheless, on 11 December 1979, Charles Haughey was elected Taoiseach and leader of Fianna Fáil, almost a decade after the Arms Crisis set back his political career. In 2010, a founder of the Saatchi & Saatchi advertising firm, said that Haughey had asked for "a new image" similar to the one provided for Margaret Thatcher for the 1979 general election.

Taoiseach (1979–1981)
When Haughey came to power, the country was sinking into a deep economic crisis, following the 1979 energy crisis. Haughey effectively acted as his own Minister for Finance, ignoring the views of his Minister. One of his first functions as Taoiseach was a televised address to the nation – only the third such address in the Republic's history – in which he outlined the bleak economic picture:

While Haughey had identified the problem with the economy, his actions made the problem worse. He increased public spending, which soon became out of control, and led to increases in borrowing and taxation at an unacceptable level. By 1981, Haughey was still reasonably popular and decided to call a general election. However, the timing of the election was thwarted twice by external events, in particular the hunger strikes of IRA volunteers for political status. The Anti H-Block Committee announced that they would field abstentionist candidates which many predicted correctly would take Republican votes away from Fianna Fáil. This coincided with the Stardust Disaster, where a fire destroyed a night club in Haughey's constituency and claimed the lives of 48 young people; these caused Haughey to delay the Ard Fheis and the election. The poll was eventually held in June, much later than Haughey wanted. In the hope of winning an overall Dáil majority Haughey's campaign took a populist line with regard to taxation, spending and Northern Ireland. The campaign was enhanced and hyped up by a live debate on RTÉ between Haughey and the Leader of the Opposition Garret FitzGerald, of Fine Gael, over the major issues. On the day of the vote Fianna Fáil won 45.5%, failing to secure a majority in the 166-seat Dáil. A Fine Gael–Labour Party coalition came to power, under FitzGerald and Haughey went into opposition.

Within days of his becoming Taoiseach, Allied Irish Banks forgave Haughey £400,000 of a £1,000,000 debt. No reason was given for this. The Economist obituary on Haughey (24 June 2006) asserted that he had warned the bank "I can be a very troublesome adversary".

Opposition (1981–1982)
FitzGerald's government lasted until January 1982, when it collapsed due to a controversial budget which proposed the application of Value Added Tax to children's shoes, previously exempt. FitzGerald, no longer having a majority in the Dáil, went to Áras an Uachtaráin, to advise President Hillery to dissolve the Dáil and call a general election. However, the night the government collapsed the Fianna Fáil Front Bench issued a statement encouraging the President not to grant the dissolution and to allow Fianna Fáil to form a government. Phone calls were also made to the President by Brian Lenihan. Haughey, on attempting to contact his former colleague, the President, and on failing to be put through to him, was reported to have threatened the president's aide de camp by telling him that he would be Taoiseach one day and when that happened, "I intend to roast your fucking arse if you don't put me through immediately". Hillery considered such pressure to be gross misconduct, and granted the dissolution.

A biography of Hillery blames Haughey for the sex scandal rumours which almost destroyed the presidency of Hillery in 1979.

Second term as Taoiseach (1982)

After the February 1982 election, when Haughey failed to win an overall majority again, questions were raised about his leadership. Some of Haughey's critics in the party suggested that an alternative candidate should stand as the party's nominee for Taoiseach. Desmond O'Malley emerged as the likely alternative candidate and was ready to challenge Haughey for the leadership. However, on the day of the vote O'Malley withdrew and Haughey went forward as the nominee. He engineered confidence and supply agreements with the Independent Socialist TD, Tony Gregory (in return for £100 million of investment in the Dublin North Inner City; a deal dubbed the Gregory Deal), the Independent Fianna Fáil TD Neil Blaney and three Workers' Party TDs, which saw him return as Taoiseach for a second time.

Haughey's second term was dominated by even more economic mismanagement, based on Haughey's policy of using government policy and money, in an effort to induce a sufficiently large share of the electorate to vote him his elusive 'overall majority' in the Dáil. With Haughey and his supporters taking a dangerously populist line in every area of policy, and refusing to address serious shortcomings in the performance of the state, a growing minority in his own party were becoming increasingly concerned. The issue of his leadership cropped up again when in October the backbench TD, Charlie McCreevy, put down a motion of no-confidence in Haughey. Desmond O'Malley disagreed with the timing but supported the hasty motion of no confidence all the same. O'Malley resigned from the cabinet prior to the vote as he was going to vote against Haughey. A campaign now started that was extremely vicious on the side of Haughey's supporters, with threats made to the careers of those who dissented from the leadership. After a marathon 15-hour party meeting, Haughey, who insisted on a roll-call as opposed to a secret ballot, and won the open ballot by 58 votes to 22. Not long after this, Haughey's government collapsed when the Workers' Party TD's and Tony Gregory withdrew their support for the government over a Fianna Fáil policy document called "The Way Forward," which would lead to massive spending cuts. Fianna Fáil lost the November 1982 election and FitzGerald once again returned as Taoiseach at the head of a Fine Gael-Labour coalition with a comfortable Dáil majority. Haughey found himself back in opposition.

In August 1982, the Attorney General Patrick Connolly was the subject of controversy when a man in his house was arrested for murder. At a press conference on the affair, Haughey was paraphrased as having described the affair as "grotesque, unbelievable, bizarre and unprecedented", from which journalist and former politician Conor Cruise O'Brien coined the term GUBU.

Return to opposition (1982–1987)
Haughey's leadership came under scrutiny for a third time when a report linked Haughey with the phone tapping of political journalists. In spite of huge pressure Haughey refused to resign and survived yet another vote of no-confidence in early 1983, albeit with a smaller majority. Haughey's success was partly due to the death of the Fianna Fáil TD Clement Coughlan, a supporter of O'Malley. Haughey's supporters managed to have the meeting moved to the following week after the funeral, which gave him more time to manoeuver. Having failed three times to oust Haughey, most of his critics gave up and returned to normal politics.

In May 1984, the New Ireland Forum Report was published. Haughey was involved in the drafting of this at the time he was in office and had agreed to potential scenarios for improving the political situation of Northern Ireland. However, on publication, Haughey rejected it and said the only possible solution was a United Ireland. This statement was criticised by the other leaders who forged the New-Ireland Forum, John Hume, Garret FitzGerald and Dick Spring. Desmond O'Malley supported the Forum report and criticised Haughey's ambiguous position, accusing him of stifling debate. At a Fianna Fáil Parliamentary Party meeting to discuss the report, the whip was removed from O'Malley, which meant he was no longer a Fianna Fáil TD. Ironically, when Haughey returned to power he embraced the Anglo-Irish Agreement that had developed from the New Ireland Forum Report.

In early 1985, a bill was introduced by the Fine Gael–Labour government to liberalise the sale of contraceptives in the country. Fianna Fáil in opposition opposed the bill. O'Malley supported it as a matter of principle rather than a political point to oppose for opposition's sake. On the day of the vote O'Malley spoke in the Dáil chamber stated:

He abstained rather than vote with the government. Despite this Haughey moved against O'Malley and in February 1985, O'Malley was charged with "conduct un-becoming". At a party meeting, even though O'Malley did not have the party whip, he was expelled from the Fianna Fáil organisation by 73 votes to 9 in roll-call vote. With George Colley dead, O'Malley expelled and other critics silenced, Haughey was finally in full control of Fianna Fáil.

O'Malley decided to form a new political party and 21 December 1985, Desmond O'Malley announced the formation of the Progressive Democrats. Several Fianna Fáil TDs joined including Mary Harney and Bobby Molloy.

In November 1985, the Anglo-Irish Agreement was signed between Garret FitzGerald and British Prime Minister Margaret Thatcher. The agreement gave Ireland a formal say in Northern Ireland and its affairs. As was the case with the New Ireland Forum Report, the Anglo-Irish Agreement was harshly criticised by Haughey, who said that he would re-negotiate it, if re-elected. FitzGerald called a general election for February 1987. The campaign was dominated by attacks on the government over severe cuts in the budget and the general mismanagement of the economy. When the results were counted Haughey had failed once again to win an overall majority for Fianna Fáil. When it came to electing a Taoiseach in the Dáil Haughey's position looked particularly volatile. When it came to a vote the Independent TD Tony Gregory voted against Fitzgerald but abstained on Haughey, seeing Haughey as the "lesser of two evils" (the reason for this was Gregory's opposition to the Anglo-Irish agreement as well as his personal dislike of Garret FitzGerald and Fine Gael). Haughey was elected Taoiseach on the casting vote of the Ceann Comhairle.

Final term as Taoiseach (1987–1992)

Haughey now headed a minority Fianna Fáil government. Fine Gael under leader Alan Dukes, made the unprecedented move, with its Tallaght strategy, of supporting the government and voting for it when it came to introducing tough economic policies. The national debt had doubled under previous administrations, so the government introduced severe budget cuts in all departments. The taxation system was transformed to encourage enterprise and employment. One of the major schemes put forward, and one which would have enormous economic benefits for the country, was the establishment of the International Financial Services Centre (IFSC) in Dublin.

In late April 1989, Haughey returned from a trip to Japan, to the news that the government was about to be defeated in a Dáil vote, on a private members' motion regarding provision of funds for HIV/AIDS sufferers. The government lost the vote, which was seen as merely embarrassing, but Haughey, buoyed by opinion polls which indicated the possibility of winning an overall majority, called a general election for 15 June. Fianna Fáil however ended up losing four seats and the possibility of forming another minority government looked slim. For the first time in history a nominee for Taoiseach failed to achieve a majority when a vote was taken in the Dáil, on 29 June 1989. Constitutionally Haughey was obliged to resign, however he refused to, for a short period. He eventually tendered his resignation to President Hillery and remained on as Taoiseach, albeit in an acting capacity. A full 27 days after the election had taken place a coalition government was formed between Fianna Fáil and the Progressive Democrats. It was the first time that Fianna Fáil had entered into a coalition, abandoning one of its "core values" in the overwhelming need to form a government.

Haughey in 1990 had more difficulties than successes. The first half of the year saw Haughey in a leading role as European statesman, when Ireland held the presidency of the European Community, which rotated semi-annually between the member states of the European Union. Haughey supported German Reunification and during the extraordinary Dublin Summit, which he called for in April, he pressed this viewpoint forward. He believed both Ireland and Germany were similar in that both countries were divided. During a Dáil debate on German Reunification, Haughey stated "I have expressed a personal view that coming as we do from a country which is also divided many of us would have sympathy with any wish of the people of the two German States for unification".

The presidential election was disappointing for Haughey with Brian Lenihan, the Tánaiste, who was nominated as the party's candidate, being defeated by Mary Robinson. During the campaign the controversy over the phone calls made to the Áras an Uachtaráin in 1982, urging the then President not to dissolve the Dáil resurfaced. Lenihan was accused of calling and attempting to influence the President, who as Head of State is above politics. The Progressive Democrats threatened to pull out of the coalition and support a Fine Gael no-confidence motion unless Haughey forced Lenihan out. Haughey tried to force Lenihan to resign, and sacked him when he refused to do so. Lenihan's dismissal damaged Haughey's standing in the Fianna Fáil organisation.

Haughey's grip on political power began to slip in the autumn of 1991. There was a series of resignations by chairmen of semi-state companies, followed by an open declaration by Minister for Finance Albert Reynolds, that he had every intention of standing for the party leadership if Haughey resigned. Following a heated parliamentary party meeting, Seán Power, one of Reynolds's supporters, put down a motion of no-confidence in Haughey. Reynolds and his supporters were sacked from the government by Haughey, who went on to win the no-confidence motion by 55 votes to 22.

Haughey's victory was short-lived, as a series of political errors would lead to his demise as Taoiseach. Controversy erupted over the attempted appointment of Jim McDaid as Minister for Defence, which saw him withdraw his nomination under pressure from O'Malley. Worse was to follow when Seán Doherty, who as Minister for Justice had taken the blame for the phone-tapping scandal of the early 1980s, went on RTÉ television, and after ten years of insisting that Haughey knew nothing of the tapping, claimed that Haughey had known and authorised it. Haughey denied this, but the Progressive Democrats members of the government stated that they could no longer continue in government with Haughey as Taoiseach. Haughey told Desmond O'Malley, the Progressive Democrats leader, that he intended to stand down shortly, but wanted to choose his own time of departure. O'Malley agreed to this and the government continued.

On 30 January 1992, Haughey resigned as leader of Fianna Fáil at a parliamentary party meeting. He remained as Taoiseach until 11 February 1992, when he was succeeded by the former Finance Minister, Albert Reynolds. During his final address to the Dáil he quoted Othello, saying "I have done the state some service, they know it, no more of that". Haughey then returned to the backbenches before retiring from politics at the 1992 general election. His son, Seán Haughey, was elected at the election that followed, in his father's old constituency. Seán Haughey was appointed as a Minister of State at the Department of Education and Science in December 2006.

Retirement, tribunals and scandal

Financial scandals
Haughey's personal wealth and extravagant lifestyle (he owned racehorses, a large motor sailing yacht Celtic Mist, an Inishvickillane island and a Gandon-designed mansion) had long been a point of speculation. He refused throughout his career to answer any questions about how he financed this lifestyle on a government salary. Despite his professed desire to fade from public attention, these questions followed him into retirement, eventually exploding into a series of political, financial and personal scandals that tarnished his image and reputation.

In 1997, a government-appointed tribunal, led by Judge Brian McCracken, first revealed that Haughey had received substantial monetary gifts from businessmen and that he had held secret offshore bank accounts in the Ansbacher Bank in the Cayman Islands. Haughey faced criminal charges for obstructing the work of the McCracken tribunal. His trial on these charges was postponed indefinitely after the judge in the case found that he would not be able to get a fair trial following prejudicial comments by the then PD leader and Tánaiste Mary Harney.

Also in 1997, the public were shocked by allegations that Haughey had embezzled money destined for the Fianna Fáil party, taxpayers' money taken from government funds earmarked for the operation of a political party, and that he had spent large portions of these funds on Charvet shirts and expensive dinners in a top Dublin restaurant, while preaching belt-tightening and implementing budget cuts as a national policy.

The subsequent Moriarty Tribunal delved further into Haughey's financial dealings. In his main report on Charles Haughey released on 19 December 2006, Mr Justice Moriarty made the following findings:

Haughey was paid more than IR£8 million between 1979 and 1986 from various benefactors and businessmen, including £1.3 million from the Dunnes Stores supermarket tycoon Ben Dunne. The tribunal described these payments as "unethical".
In May 1989 one of Haughey's lifelong friends, former government minister Brian Lenihan, underwent a liver transplant which was partly paid for through fundraising by Haughey. The Moriarty tribunal found that of the £270,000 collected in donations for Brian Lenihan, no more than £70,000 ended up being spent on Lenihan's medical care. The tribunal identified one specific donation of £20,000 for Lenihan that was surreptitiously appropriated by Haughey, who took steps to conceal this transaction.
The tribunal found evidence of favours performed in return for money: Saudi businessman Mahmoud Fustok paid Haughey £50,000 to support applications for Irish citizenship.
 In other evidence of favours performed, the tribunal reported that Haughey arranged meetings between Ben Dunne and civil servant Seamus Pairceir of the Revenue Commissioners. These discussions resulted in an outstanding capital gains tax bill for Dunne being reduced by £22.8 million. Moriarty found that this was "not coincidental", and that it was a substantial benefit conferred on Dunne by Haughey's actions.
Allied Irish Banks settled a million-pound overdraft with Haughey soon after he became Taoiseach in 1979; the tribunal found that the lenience shown by the bank in this case amounted to an indirect payment by the bank to Haughey.

The tribunal rejected Haughey's claims of ignorance of his own financial affairs and Haughey was accused by the tribunal of "devaluing democracy".

Haughey eventually agreed a settlement with the revenue and paid a total of €6.5 million in back taxes and penalties to the Revenue Commissioners in relation to these donations. In August 2003 Haughey was forced to sell his large estate, Abbeville, in Kinsealy in north County Dublin for €45 million to settle legal fees he had incurred during the tribunals. He continued to live at Abbeville and own the island of Inishvickillane off the coast of County Kerry until his death.

Terry Keane affair
In May 1999, Terry Keane, gossip columnist and once wife of former Chief Justice of Ireland Ronan Keane, revealed on The Late Late Show that she and Haughey had conducted a 27-year extramarital affair. In a move that she subsequently said she deeply regretted, Keane confirmed that the man she had been referring to for years in her newspaper column as "sweetie" was indeed Haughey. The revelation on the television programme shocked at least some of the audience, including Haughey's son Seán who was watching the show. Haughey's wife Maureen was also said to have been deeply hurt by the circumstances of the revelation.

Death and funeral
Haughey's attendance before the tribunals had repeatedly been disrupted by illness. He died from prostate cancer, from which he had suffered for a decade, on 13 June 2006, at his home in Kinsealy, County Dublin, aged 80.

Haughey received a state funeral on 16 June 2006. He was buried in St. Fintan's Cemetery, Sutton in County Dublin, following mass at Donnycarney. The then Taoiseach Bertie Ahern delivered the graveside oration.

The funeral rites were screened live on RTÉ One and watched by a quarter of a million people. It was attended by President Mary McAleese, the Taoiseach, Bertie Ahern, members of the Oireachtas, many from the world of politics, industry and business. The chief celebrant was Haughey's brother, Father Eoghan Haughey.

Legacy
Former Taoiseach Garret FitzGerald said that Haughey had the potential to be one of the best Taoisigh that the country ever had, had his preoccupation with wealth and power not clouded his judgement: 

Taoiseach Bertie Ahern said,

Historian Diarmaid Ferriter said, 
Historian John A. Murphy said, 

Haughey was characterised in a 2012 novel Ratlines, by Stuart Neville. A three-part television drama Charlie, covering Haughey between 1979 and 1992, débuted on RTÉ in January 2015.

Governments
The following governments were led by Haughey:
16th Government of Ireland (December 1979 – June 1981)
18th Government of Ireland (March 1982 – December 1982)
20th Government of Ireland (March 1987 – July 1989)
21st Government of Ireland (July 1989 – February 1992)

See also
Families in the Oireachtas
Haughey
Haughey (TV series)

References

Sources
 
 T. Ryle Dwyer, Short Fellow: A Biography of Charles J. Haughey (Marino, 1994) 
 T. Ryle Dwyer, Nice Fellow: A Biography of Jack Lynch (Marino, 2004) 
 T. Ryle Dwyer, Charlie: The political biography of Charles Haughey (1987) 
 
 
 Raymond Smith, Garret: The Enigma (Aherlow, 1986)

Further reading
 
 Kelly, Stephen. "'The Totality of Relationships': The Haughey-Thatcher Relationship and the Anglo-Irish Summit Meeting, 8 December 1980." Eire-Ireland 51.3 (2016): 244–273.
 Kelly, Stephen, 'A failed political entity': Charles Haughey and the Northern Ireland question, 1945-1992 (Kildare: Merrion Press, 2016). , a standard scholarly biography
 
 
 Wilsford, David, ed. Political leaders of contemporary Western Europe: a biographical dictionary (Greenwood, 1995) pp. 188–95.
 The most controversial of them all – Irish Times

External links

 charlesjhaughey.ie "The official memorial website ... established with the consent of his family"

-

-

-

-

 
1925 births
2006 deaths
Alumni of University College Dublin
Burials at St. Fintan's Cemetery, Sutton
Deaths from cancer in the Republic of Ireland
Deaths from prostate cancer
Fianna Fáil TDs
Military personnel from County Mayo
Irish people convicted of tax crimes
Leaders of Fianna Fáil
Lemass family
Members of the 16th Dáil
Members of the 17th Dáil
Members of the 18th Dáil
Members of the 19th Dáil
Members of the 20th Dáil
Members of the 21st Dáil
Members of the 22nd Dáil
Members of the 23rd Dáil
Members of the 24th Dáil
Members of the 25th Dáil
Members of the 26th Dáil
Ministers for Agriculture (Ireland)
Ministers for Education (Ireland)
Ministers for Finance (Ireland)
Ministers for Health (Ireland)
Ministers for Justice (Ireland)
Ministers for Social Affairs (Ireland)
People from Castlebar
Politicians from County Mayo
Presidents of the European Council
Taoisigh
Parnells Gaelic footballers (Dublin)
Dublin Gaelic footballers
Alumni of King's Inns
People educated at St. Joseph's CBS, Fairview
Haughey family